Thomas Harrison House may refer to:

Thomas Harrison House (Branford, Connecticut), listed on the NRHP in Connecticut
Thomas Harrison House (Harrisonburg, Virginia), listed on the NRHP in Virginia

See also
Harrison House (disambiguation)